Robert F. Kennedy (1925–1968) was an American politician who served as U.S. Attorney General and a U.S. Senator until his assassination.

Robert Kennedy may also refer to:
 Robert Kennedy (cricketer) (born 1972), cricketer from New Zealand
 Robert Kennedy (field hockey) (1880–1963), Irish field hockey player
 Robert Kennedy (high jumper) (1916–2004), British Olympic athlete
 Robert Kennedy (Jesuit) (born 1933), Zen priest, Jesuit, psychotherapist, professor and author
 Robert Kennedy (publisher) (1938–2012), magazine publisher
 Robert B. Kennedy (1940–2018), American politician from Lowell, Massachusetts
 Robert D. Kennedy, American businessman
 Robert E. Kennedy (university dean), university administrator
 Robert E. Kennedy (university president) (1915–2010), president emeritus of California Polytechnic State University
 Robert F. Kennedy Jr. (born 1954), American environmental lawyer and son of Robert F. Kennedy
 Robert Foster Kennedy (1884–1952), Irish-American neurologist
 Robert H. Kennedy (1869–1951), farmer, merchant and political figure in Nova Scotia, Canada
 Robert Lenox Kennedy (1822–1887), American banker and philanthropist
 Robert P. Kennedy (1840–1918), American politician, U.S. Representative from Ohio
 Robert Kennedy (chemist) (born 1962), American chemist
 Robert Kennedy (St. Paul) (1801–1889), businessman and town president of Saint Paul, Minnesota
 Robert Cobb Kennedy (1835–1865), Confederate operative hanged for his role in a plot to burn New York City

Bob or Bobby Kennedy 
 Bob Kennedy (1920–2005), American baseball player and manager
 Bob Kennedy (American football, born 1921) (1921–2010), American football running back
 Bob Kennedy (American football, born 1928) (1928–1991), American football player
 Bob Kennedy (ice hockey) (1930–1998), Canadian ice hockey player
 Bob Kennedy (runner) (born 1970), American distance runner
 Bobby Kennedy (footballer) (born 1937), Scottish footballer
 Bobby Kennedy (racing driver) (born 1993), American racing driver